2015–16 Vijay Hazare Trophy is the 14th season of the Vijay Hazare Trophy, a List A cricket tournament in India. It is contested by 27 domestic cricket teams of India divided into 4 Groups. The winner will advance to play 2015–16 Deodhar Trophy.
The top two teams advanced to the quarter finals.

Fixtures

Round one
MS Dhoni returned to play domestic cricket after a gap of around eight years in the opening game against J&K. The first outing however ended in mixed results for the India ODI and T20 captain as he got out for nine but his team led by Varun Aaron registered a thrilling victory.

Propelled by Ishank Jaggi and Kaushal Singh's half-centuries, Jharkhand posted 210. Shahbaz Nadeem then claimed three for 28 while Rahul Shukla took two wickets to restrict the Mithun Manhas-led team to 201 in their allotted 50 overs while Aaron went wicketless in the match.

Despite captain Vinay Kumar's unbeaten half-century that helped Karnataka post 228 runs on the board followed by a four-wicket haul, the team lost their opening match to Railways in a close finish. 

Earlier, debutant pacer Akshat Pandey and left-arm spinner Ashish Yadav claimed three wickets to keep Karnataka in check. Barring Mayank Agarwal the rest of the batting line-up departed for low scores. Manish Pandey returned for two while Stuart Binny was back in the dressing room for 18. Karn Sharma who had claimed two wickets returned to score a valuable 51 to help chase down the target. Besides him, Asadullah Khan and Mahesh Rawat to posted half-centuries that helped Railways seize a victory.

Haryana pulled off a nine-run win under the captaincy of Mohit Sharma against Kerala. The team, were helped to 241 by half-centurions N Saini and M Hooda followed by useful contributions from A Mishra (40*) and J Yadav (27). Yadav then returned to claim the key wicket of Sanju Samson and accounted for Jafar Jamal in an over and followed up with the wicket of F Ahmed in his next to leave Kerala on 106 for six. Mishra and Mohit then wrapped-up the opposition to bowl Haryana to victory.

Round two
Gujarat opened their account in the 2015-16 season of the tournament with a six-wicket win over Jharkhand in a low scoring 47-overs-a-side match at the Alur Cricket Stadium-III. 

MS Dhoni top-scored for Jharkhand with 44 runs while the rest lost their wickets regularly. Axar Patel and Jasprit Bumrah claimed two wickets each to restrict Jharkhand to 177 for seven after captain Parthiv Patel elected to field. 

P Panchal (62) and Patel (44) then set-up the chase with a 106-run stand after Varun Aaron claimed Smit Patel for two. 

Axar then took the team to the target with R Bhatt with 38 balls to spare. After two games, Jharkhand have one win and one loss. 

Useful contributions by the lower-order - J Suchith (46) and Vinay Kumar (41) helped Karnataka to 242 after being asked to bat by Haryana skipper Mohit Sharma. Both then returned to contribute with the ball. The Karnataka captain claimed two wickets up front after Abhimanyu Mithun accounted for Saini to reduce Haryana to 10 for three. While R Dagar strove to keep Haryana in the match, he was left stranded on 96 as the team were bowled out for 204. Mithun, Vinay and Suchith claimed two wickets each for Karnataka.

Opener VA Jagadeesh propelled Kerala to 256 for eight with 121 off 137 balls. The century complemented by useful contributions from the middle-order helped the team set Railways a modest target. The Warrier-led attack then skittled Railways out for 196 to post a comprehensive win. 

Warrier, Fabid Ahmed, P Padmanabhan and Rohan Prem claimed two wickets each to bowl Kerala to victory.

Round three

Round four

Round five

Round six

Round seven

References

Domestic cricket competitions in 2015–16